Delroy Parkes is a British retired boxer who competed for England.

Boxing career
Parkes represented England and won a silver medal in the middleweight (-75 Kg) division, at the 1978 Commonwealth Games in Edmonton, Alberta, Canada.

Parkes was National Championship runner-up to Herol Graham in the prestigious 1978 ABA middleweight Championship, boxing for the Royal Air Force.

References

English male boxers
Boxers at the 1978 Commonwealth Games
Commonwealth Games medallists in boxing
Commonwealth Games silver medallists for England
Middleweight boxers
Medallists at the 1978 Commonwealth Games